The Building at 6 and 7 Public Square, in Bowman, Georgia, was built in 1908.  It was listed on the National Register of Historic Places in 2009.

It is a one-story commercial building, Italianate in style, with two commercial spaces.

Contributing to its significance is that "Its facade retains not only its decorative brickwork but also its cast-iron columns, recessed entrance, plate-glass windows, and its interior retains its coved pressed-metal ceilings—architectural features often lost or obscured on many other commercial buildings of this period."

References

National Register of Historic Places in Elbert County, Georgia
Italianate architecture in Georgia (U.S. state)
Buildings and structures completed in 1908